Marvel is both a surname and a given name. Notable people and characters with the name include:

Surname
Andy Marvel (born 1958), American songwriter and music producer
Carl Shipp Marvel (1894-1988), American polymer chemist
Elizabeth Marvel (born 1969), American actress
James Marvel (born 1993), Baseball pitcher
John Marvel (1926-2013), American rancher and politician

Given name
Marvel Cooke (1903-2000), African-American journalist, writer and civil rights activist
Marvel Crosson (1900-1929), American pioneer aviator
M. M. Logan (1874-1939), American politician
Marvel Marilyn Maxwell (1921-1972), American actress and entertainer
Marvel Rea (1901-1937), American silent film actress
Marvel Smith (born 1978), former National Football League offensive tackle
Marvel (footballer) (Marvelous Antolín Garzón; born 2003), Moroccan born, Spanish association footballer

Fictional characters
 Captain Marvel (disambiguation), various comic book superheroes
 Ms. Marvel, a Marvel Comics character
 Marvel Family, DC Comics characters
 Mary Marvel, a comic book superheroine
 Uncle Marvel, originally a Fawcett Comics character, currently owned by DC Comics
 Marvel, also known as Kal AOL, a character who appeared in Marville
 Professor Marvel, the touring magician/fortune teller in MGM's 1939 film The Wizard of Oz
 Marvel, a character in The Hunger Games

See also
 Marvelman, a British comics character who, for legal reasons, had to change his name to Miracleman
 Marvel Man, a Marvel Comics character now known as Quasar
 Marvel Boy, a number of characters from Marvel and their predecessors
 Marvel Girl, three female Marvel Comics characters
 Black Marvel, a Marvel Comics superhero
 Blue Marvel (Marvel Comics), a Marvel Comics character